USS Kickapoo was a double-turreted  river monitor, the lead ship of her class, built for the Union Navy during the American Civil War. The ship supported Union forces during the Mobile Campaign as they attacked Confederate fortifications defending the city of Mobile, Alabama in early 1865. She was placed in reserve after the end of the war and sold in 1874.

Description
She had a tonnage of 970 tons burthen and displaced . Her crew numbered 138 officers and enlisted men.

The ship was powered by two 2-cylinder horizontal non-condensing steam engines, each driving two propellers, using steam generated by seven tubular boilers. Kickapoo carried  of coal.

The ship's main armament consisted of four smoothbore, muzzle-loading 11-inch Dahlgren guns mounted in two twin-gun turrets. Her forward turret was designed by James Eads and her rear turret by John Ericsson.

The cylindrical turrets were protected by eight layers of wrought iron  plates.

Construction and service
James Eads was awarded the contracts for all four of the Milwaukee-class ships. He subcontracted Kickapoo to G. B. Allen & Co. of St. Louis, Missouri who laid down the ship in 1862. She was the first U.S. Navy ship to be named after the Indian tribe, and was launched on 12 March 1864. Kickapoo was brought to Mound City, Illinois, on the Ohio River, for fitting out and commissioned on 8 July 1864 with Lieutenant David C. Woods in command.

The ship was initially assigned to the Mississippi River Squadron and spent the summer off the mouth of the Red River. She was transferred to the West Gulf Blockading Squadron on 1 October. Although the victory at the Battle of Mobile Bay on 5 August had closed the port of Mobile to blockade runners, the city itself had not been taken. The Confederates fortified the approaches to the city and heavily mined the shallow waters surrounding it. Lieutenant Commander Meriweather P. Jones relieved Woods on 23 December.

Milwaukee remained afloat forward long enough to allow her crew to escape without loss and they were rescued by Kickapoo. She rescued the crew of the river monitor  the following day after that ship also struck a mine and sank. In late June, the ship sailed to New Orleans to be placed in ordinary; she was decommissioned on 29 July. Kickapoo was renamed to Cyclops on 15 June 1869 and then Kewaydin on 10 August. The ship was sold on 12 September 1874.

Notes

References

 
 
 
 
 

 

Milwaukee-class monitors
Ships built in St. Louis
1863 ships
Ships of the Union Navy
American Civil War monitors of the United States